Carlos Daniel Calzadilla Durán (born 14 November 2001) is a Venezuelan footballer who plays as an winger for Venezuelan Primera División side Deportivo Táchira.

Career

Club career
Calzadilla is a product of Deportivo Táchira. He got his official and professional debut for Deportivo Táchira on 8 February 2020 against Aragua F.C. in the Venezuelan Primera División. Calzadilla made five league appearances in his debut season.

References

External links

Living people
2001 births
Association football wingers
Venezuelan footballers
Venezuelan Primera División players
Deportivo Táchira F.C. players
People from San Cristóbal, Táchira
21st-century Venezuelan people